Eduardo González Lanuza (July 11, 1900 - July 17, 1984) was an Argentine poet born in Santander, Spain. One of his best known work is "Poem for Being Recorded in a Phonograph Disc" (1932). He also was part of the Ultraist movement and one of the founders of Prisma and Proa magazines as well as contributor in Martín Fierro magazine.

Selected works
Prisms (1924) (poetry)
Coven (1927) (short stories)
While the Clock Strikes Six O'Clock (1931) co-written with Armando Villar (theatre)
Thirtysome Poems (1932) (poetry)
Mr. Pulcinella's Walking Stick (1935) (theatre)
The Cutthroating of the Innocent (1938) (poetry)
Not Even the Flood (1939) (theatre)
Handful of Songs (1940) (poetry)
Passable Glass (1943) (poetry)
Ode to Joy and Other Poems (1949) (poetry)
Christmas and Passion Altarpieces (1953) (poetry)
Sum and Go On (1960) (poetry)
Christmas Mystery (1966) (theatre)
Profession of Faith (1970) (poetry)
Hai-Kais (1977) (poetry)
The Pimpirigallo and Other Little Birds (1980) (poetry)
Tunes for Songs (1981)

20th-century Argentine poets
20th-century Argentine male writers
Argentine male poets
1900 births
1984 deaths
People from Santander, Spain
Spanish emigrants to Argentina